Beara is a genus of moths of the family Nolidae. The genus was erected by Francis Walker in 1866.

Description
Palpi upturned, reaching above vertex of head, and third joint rather long. Antennae minutely ciliated (haired) in male. Forewings with arched costa, acute apex and excurved outer margin. Vein 8 anastomosing (fusing) with vein 9 and 10 to form very minute areole. Hindwings with stalked veins 3 and 4.

Species
Beara achromatica Hampson, 1918
Beara cornuta Holloway, 1982
Beara dichromella Walker, 1866
Beara falcata Holloway, 1982
Beara nubiferella Walker, 1866
Beara simplex Warren, 1912
Beara tortriciformis (Strand, 1917)

References

Chloephorinae